Sägistalsee is a lake in Canton of Berne, Switzerland. The lake's sediments were studied to determine past climate and human activities.

See also
List of mountain lakes of Switzerland

External links

Lakes of Switzerland
Bernese Oberland
Lakes of the canton of Bern